Generation Z (or more commonly Gen Z for short), colloquially known as zoomers, is the demographic cohort succeeding Millennials and preceding Generation Alpha. Researchers and popular media use the mid-to-late 1990s as starting birth years and the early 2010s as ending birth years. Most members of Generation Z are children of Generation X.

As the first social generation to have grown up with access to the Internet and portable digital technology from a young age, members of Generation Z, even if not necessarily digitally literate, have been dubbed "digital natives". Moreover, the negative effects of screen time are most pronounced in adolescents compared to younger children. Compared to previous generations, members of Generation Z tend to live more slowly than their predecessors when they were their age; have lower rates of teenage pregnancies; and consume alcohol (but not necessarily other psychoactive drugs) less often. Generation Z teenagers are more concerned than older generations with academic performance and job prospects, and are better at delaying gratification than their counterparts from the 1960s despite concerns to the contrary. Sexting among adolescents has grown in prevalence; the consequences of this remain poorly understood. Additionally, Gen Z subcultures have been quieter though they have not necessarily disappeared.

Globally, there is evidence that the average age of pubertal onset among girls has decreased considerably compared to the 20th century with implications for their welfare and their future. Additionally, the prevalence of allergies among adolescents and young adults in Generation Z is greater than the general population; there is greater awareness and diagnosis of mental health conditions, and sleep deprivation is more frequently reported. In many countries, Gen Z youth are more likely to be diagnosed with intellectual disabilities and psychiatric disorders than older generations.

Around the world, members of Generation Z are spending more time on electronic devices and less time reading books than before, with implications for their attention spans, vocabulary, academic performance, and future economic contributions. In Asia, educators in the 2000s and 2010s typically sought out and nourished top students; in Western Europe and the United States, the emphasis was on poor performers. Furthermore, East Asian and Singaporean students consistently earned the top spots in international standardized tests in the 2010s.

As consumers, their aggregate purchasing behavior deviates from the ideals and values commonly associated with them in opinion polls.

Etymology and nomenclature 

The name Generation Z is a reference to the fact that it is the second generation after Generation X, continuing the alphabetical sequence from Generation Y (Millennials).

Other proposed names for the generation included iGeneration, Homeland Generation, Net Gen, Digital Natives, Neo-Digital Natives, Pluralist Generation, Internet Generation, Centennials, and Post-Millennials.

Psychology professor and author Jean Twenge used the term iGeneration (or iGen for short), originally intending to use it as the title of her 2006 book about Millennials, Generation Me, before being overruled by her publisher, Atria Publishing Group. At that time, there were iPods and iMac computers but no iPhones or iPads. Twenge later used the term for her 2017 book iGen. The name has also been asserted to have been created by demographer Cheryl Russell in 2009.

In 2014, author Neil Howe coined the term Homeland Generation as a continuation of the Strauss–Howe generational theory with William Strauss. The term Homeland refers to being the first generation to enter childhood after protective surveillance state measures, like the Department of Homeland Security, were put into effect following the September 11 attacks.

The Pew Research Center surveyed the various names for this cohort on Google Trends in 2019 and found that in the U.S., the term Generation Z was overwhelmingly the most popular. The Merriam-Webster and Oxford dictionaries both have official entries for Generation Z.

In Japan, the cohort is described as neo-digital natives, a step beyond the previous cohort described as digital natives. Digital natives primarily communicate by text or voice, while neo-digital natives use video, video-telephony, and movies. This emphasizes the shift from PC to mobile and text to video among the neo-digital population.

Zoomer is an informal term used to refer to members of Generation Z. It combines the shorthand boomer, referring to baby boomers, with the "Z" from Generation Z.  Zoomer in its current incarnation skyrocketed in popularity in 2018, when it was used in a 4chan internet meme mocking Gen Z adolescents via a Wojak caricature dubbed a "Zoomer". Merriam-Webster's records suggest the use of the term zoomer in the sense of Generation Z dates back at least as far as 2016. It was added to the Merriam-Webster dictionary in October 2021. Prior to this, zoomer was occasionally used to describe particularly active baby boomers.

Date and age range
Although the exact birth years of Generation Z are not specifically defined, researchers and popular media typically use the mid-to-late 1990s as starting birth years and the early 2010s as ending birth years.

The Oxford Dictionaries describes Generation Z as "the generation born in the late 1990s or the early 21st century, perceived as being familiar with the use of digital technology, the internet, and social media from a very young age." The Collins Dictionary define Generation Z as "members of the generation of people born between the mid-1990s and mid-2010s who are seen as confident users of new technology". The Merriam-Webster Online Dictionary defines Generation Z as "the generation of people born in the late 1990s and early 2000s."

The Pew Research Center has defined 1997 as the starting birth year for Generation Z, basing this on "different formative experiences", such as new technological and socioeconomic developments, as well as growing up in a world after the September 11 attacks. Pew has not specified an endpoint for Generation Z, but used 2012 as a tentative endpoint for their 2019 report. Numerous news outlets use a starting birth year of 1997, often citing Pew Research Center. Various think tanks and analytics companies also have set a 1997 start date. In a 2022 report, the U.S. Census designates Generation Z as "the youngest generation with adult members (born 1997 to 2013)." Statistics Canada used 1997 to 2012, citing Pew Research Center, in a 2022 publication analyzing their 2021 census.

Other news outlets have used 1995 as the starting birth year of Generation Z, as do various management and consulting firms. Psychologist Jean Twenge has defined Generation Z as the "iGeneration" using a range of those born between 1995 and 2012. The Australian Bureau of Statistics uses 1996 to 2010 to define Generation Z in a 2021 Census report.

Individuals born in the Millennial and Generation Z cusp years have been sometimes identified as a "microgeneration" with characteristics of both generations. The most common name given for these cuspers is Zillennials.

Arts and culture

Happiness and personal values 
The Economist has described Generation Z as a more educated, well-behaved, stressed and depressed generation in comparison to previous generations. In 2016, the Varkey Foundation and Populus conducted an international study examining the attitudes of over 20,000 people aged 15 to 21 in twenty countries: Argentina, Australia, Brazil, Canada, China, France, Germany, India, Indonesia, Israel, Italy, Japan, New Zealand, Nigeria, Russia, South Africa, South Korea, Turkey, the United Kingdom, and the United States. They found that Gen Z youth were happy overall with the states of affairs in their personal lives (59%). The most unhappy young people were from South Korea (29%) and Japan (28%) while the happiest hailed from Indonesia (90%) and Nigeria (78%) (see right). In order to determine the overall 'happiness score' for each country, researchers subtracted the percentage of people who said they were unhappy from that of those who said they were happy. The most important sources of happiness were being physically and mentally healthy (94%), having a good relationship with one's family (92%), and one's friends (91%). In general, respondents who were younger and male tended to be happier. Religious faith came in last at 44%. Nevertheless, religion was a major source of happiness for Gen Z youth from Indonesia (93%), Nigeria (86%), Turkey (71%), China, and Brazil (both 70%). The top reasons for anxiety and stress were money (51%) and school (46%); social media and having access to basic resources (such as food and water) finished the list, both at 10%. Concerns over food and water were most serious in China (19%), India (16%), and Indonesia (16%); young Indians were also more likely than average to report stress due to social media (19%).

According to the aforementioned study by the Varkey Foundation, the most important personal values to these people were helping their families and themselves get ahead in life (both 27%), followed by honesty (26%). Looking beyond their local communities came last at 6%. Familial values were especially strong in South America (34%) while individualism and the entrepreneurial spirit proved popular in Africa (37%). People who influenced youths the most were parents (89%), friends (79%), and teachers (70%). Celebrities (30%) and politicians (17%) came last. In general, young men were more likely to be influenced by athletes and politicians than young women, who preferred books and fictional characters. Celebrity culture was especially influential in China (60%) and Nigeria (71%) and particularly irrelevant in Argentina and Turkey (both 19%). For young people, the most important factors for their current or future careers were the possibility of honing their skills (24%), and income (23%) while the most unimportant factors were fame (3%) and whether or not the organization they worked for made a positive impact on the world (13%). The most important factors for young people when thinking about their futures were their families (47%) and their health (21%); the welfare of the world at large (4%) and their local communities (1%) bottomed the list.

Common culture 

During the 2000s and especially the 2010s, youth subcultures that were as influential as what existed during the late 20th century became scarcer and quieter, at least in real life though not necessarily on the Internet, and more ridden with irony and self-consciousness due to the awareness of incessant peer surveillance. In Germany, for instance, youth appears more interested in a more mainstream lifestyle with goals such as finishing school, owning a home in the suburbs, maintaining friendships and family relationships, and stable employment, rather than popular culture, glamor, or consumerism.

Boundaries between the different youth subcultures appear to have been blurred, and nostalgic sentiments have risen. Although an aesthetic dubbed 'cottagecore' in 2018 has been around for many years, it has become a subculture of Generation Z, especially on various social media networks in the wake of the mass lockdowns imposed to combat the spread of COVID-19. It is a form of escapism and aspirational nostalgia. Cottagecore became even more popular thanks to the commercial success of the 2020 album Folklore by singer and songwriter Taylor Swift.

Nostalgia culture among Generation Z even extends to the usage of automobiles; in some countries, such as Indonesia, there are social media communities surrounding the purchasing used cars from earlier decades.

A survey conducted by OnePoll in 2018 found that while museums and heritage sites remained popular among Britons between the ages of 18 and 30, 19% did not visit one in the previous year. There was a big gender gap in attitudes, with 16% of female respondents and 26% of male respondents saying they never visited museums. Generation Z preferred staying home and watching television or browsing social media networks to visiting museums or galleries. The researchers also found that cheaper tickets, more interactive exhibitions, a greater variety of events, more food and beverage options, more convenient opening hours, and greater online presence could attract the attention of more young people. On the other hand, vintage fashion is growing in popularity among Millennial and Generation Z consumers.

A 2019 report by Childwise found that children between the ages of five and sixteen in the U.K. spent an average of three hours each day online. Around 70% watched Netflix in the past week and only 10% watched their favorite programs on television. Among those who watched on-demand shows, 58% did so on a mobile phone, 51% on a television set, 40% via a tablet, 35% on a gaming console, and 27% on a laptop. About one out of four came from families with voice-command computer assistants such as Alexa. YouTube and Snapchat are the most popular gateways for music and video discovery. Childwise also found that certain television series aired between the 1990s and early 2000s, such as Friends, proved popular among young people of the 2010s.
Figures from Nielsen and Magna Global revealed that the viewership of children's cable television channels such as Disney Channel, Cartoon Network, and Nickelodeon continued their steady decline from the early 2010s, with little to no alleviating effects due to the COVID-19 pandemic, which forced many parents and their children to stay at home. On the other hand, streaming services saw healthy growth. Disney Channel in particular lost a third of their viewers in 2020, leading to closures in Scandinavia, the United Kingdom, Australia, and Southeast Asia.

During the first two decades of the 21st century, writing and reading fan fiction and creating fandoms of fictional works became a prevalent activity worldwide. Demographic data from various depositories revealed that those who read and wrote fan fiction were overwhelmingly young, in their teens and twenties, and female. For example, an analysis published in 2019 by data scientists Cecilia Aragon and Katie Davis of the site FanFiction.Net showed that some 60 billion words of contents were added during the previous 20 years by 10 million English-speaking people whose median age was 15 years. Fan fiction writers base their work on various internationally popular cultural phenomena such as K-pop, anime, video games, Disney films, Star Trek, Harry Potter, Twilight, Doctor Who, Star Wars, and My Little Pony, known as 'canon', as well as other things they considered important to their lives, like natural disasters. Much of fan fiction concerns the romantic pairing of fictional characters of interest, or 'shipping'. Aragon and Davis argued that writing fan fiction stories could help young people combat social isolation and hone their writing skills outside of school in an environment of like-minded people where they can receive (anonymous) constructive feedback, what they call 'distributed mentoring'. Informatics specialist Rebecca Black added that fan fiction writing could also be a useful resource for English-language learners. Indeed, the analysis of Aragon and Davis showed that for every 650 reviews a fan fiction writer receives, their vocabulary improved by one year of age, though this may not generalize to older cohorts. On the other hand, children browsing fan fiction contents might be exposed to cyberbullying, crude comments, and other inappropriate materials.

Generation Z has a plethora of options when it comes to music consumption, allowing for a highly personalized experience. According to digital media company Sweety High's 2018 Gen Z Music Consumption & Spending Report, Spotify ranked first for music listening among Gen Z females, terrestrial radio ranked second, while YouTube was reported to be the preferred platform for music discovery. Additional research showed that within the past few decades, popular music has gotten slower; that majorities of listeners young and old preferred older songs rather than keeping up with new ones; that the language of popular songs was becoming more negative psychologically; and that lyrics were becoming simpler and more repetitive, approaching one-word sheets, something measurable by observing how efficiently lossless compression algorithms (such as the LZ algorithm) handled them. Sad music is quite popular among adolescents, though it can dampen their moods, especially among girls.

A 2020 survey conducted by The Center for Generational Kinetics, on 1000 members of Generation Z and 1000 Millennials, suggests that Generation Z still would like to travel, despite the COVID-19 pandemic and the recession it induced. However, Generation Z is more likely to look carefully for package deals that would bring them the most value for their money, as many of them are already saving money for buying a house and for retirement, and they prefer more physically active trips. Mobile-friendly websites and social-media engagements are both important.

In South Korea, people below the age of 40 are increasingly interested in relocating from the cities, especially Seoul, to the countryside and working on the farm. Working in a conglomerate like Samsung or Hyundai no longer appeals to young people, many of whom prefer to avoid becoming a workaholic or are pessimistic about their ability to be as successful as their fathers. They take advantage of the Internet to market and sell their fresh produce. In the United Kingdom, teenagers now prefer to get their news from social-media networks such as Instagram and TikTok and the video-sharing site YouTube rather than more traditional media, such as radio or television.

Reading habits 

In New Zealand, child development psychologist Tom Nicholson noted a marked decline in vocabulary usage and reading among schoolchildren, many of whom are reluctant to use the dictionary. According to a 2008 survey by the National Education Monitoring Project, about one in five four-year and eight-year pupils read books as a hobby, a ten-percent drop from 2000.

In the United Kingdom, a survey of 2,000 parents and children from 2013 by Nielsen Book found that 36% of children read books for pleasure on a daily basis, 60% on a weekly basis, and 72% were read to by their parents at least once per week. Among British children, the most popular leisure activities were watching television (36%), reading (32%), social networking (20%), watching YouTube videos (17%), and playing games on mobile phones (16%). Between 2012 and 2013, children reported spending more time with video games, YouTube, and texting but less time reading (down eight percent). Among children between the ages of 11 and 17, the share of non-readers grew from 13% to 27% between 2012 and 2013, those who read once to thrice a month (occasional readers) dropped from 45% to 38%, those who read for no more than an average of 15 minutes per week (light readers) rose from 23% to 27%, those who read between 15 and 45 minutes per week (medium readers) declined from 23% to 17%, and those who read at least 45 minutes a week (heavy readers) grew slightly from 15% to 16%.

A survey by the National Literacy Trust from 2019 showed that only 26% of people below the age of 18 spent at least some time each day reading, the lowest level since records began in 2005. Interest in reading for pleasure declined with age, with five- to eight-year-olds being twice as likely to say they enjoyed reading compared to fourteen- to sixteen-year-olds. There was a significant gender gap in voluntary reading, with only 47% of boys compared to 60% of girls said they read for pleasure. One in three children reported having trouble finding something interesting to read.

The aforementioned Nielsen Book survey found that the share of British households with at least one electronic tablet rose from 24% to 50% between 2012 and 2013. According to a 2020 Childwise report based on interviews with 2,200 British children between the ages of five and sixteen, young people today are highly dependent on their mobile phones. Most now get their first device at the age of seven. By the age of eleven, having a cell phone became almost universal. Among those aged seven to sixteen, the average time spent on the phone each day is three and a third hours. 57% said they went to bed with their phones beside them and 44% told the interviewers they felt "uncomfortable" in the absence of their phones. Due to the nature of this technology—cell phones are personal and private devices—it can be difficult for parents to monitor their children's activities and shield them from inappropriate content.

Demographics 
Although many countries have aging populations and declining birth rates, Generation Z is currently the largest generation on Earth. Bloomberg's analysis of United Nations data predicted that, in 2019, members of Generation Z accounted for 2.47 billion (32%) of the 7.7 billion inhabitants of Earth, surpassing the Millennial population of 2.43 billion. The generational cutoff of Generation Z and Millennials for this analysis was placed at 2000 to 2001.

Africa 
Generation Z currently comprises the majority of the population of Africa. In 2017, 60% of the 1.2 billion people living in Africa fell below the age of 25.

In 2019, 46% of the South African population, or 27.5 million people, are members of Generation Z.

Statistical projections from the United Nations in 2019 suggest that, in 2020, the people of Niger had a median age of 15.2, Mali 16.3, Chad 16.6, Somalia, Uganda, and Angola all 16.7, the Democratic Republic of the Congo 17.0, Burundi 17.3, Mozambique and Zambia both 17.6. This means that more than half of their populations were born in the first two decades of the 21st century. These are the world's youngest countries by median age.

Asia 
According to a 2020 McKinsey & Company analysis, Generation Z (defined as born from 1996 to 2012) will account for a quarter of the population of the Asia-Pacific region by 2025.

As a result of cultural ideals, government policy, and modern medicine, there have been severe gender population imbalances in China and India. According to the United Nations, in 2018, there were 112 Chinese males for every hundred females ages 15 to 29; in India, there were 111 males for every hundred females in that age group. China had a total of 34 million excess males and India 37 million, more than the entire population of Malaysia. Together, China and India had a combined 50 million excess males under the age of 20. Such a discrepancy fuels loneliness epidemics, human trafficking (from elsewhere in Asia, such as Cambodia and Vietnam), and prostitution, among other societal problems.

Europe 
Out of the approximately 66.8 million people of the UK in 2019, there were approximately 12.6 million people (18.8%) in Generation Z, if defined as those born from 1997 to 2012.

Generation Z is the most diverse generation in the European Union in regards to national origin. In Europe generally, 13.9% of those ages 14 and younger in 2019 (which includes older Generation Alpha) were born in another EU Member State, and 6.6% were born outside the EU. In Luxembourg, 20.5% were born in another country, largely within the EU (6.6% outside the EU compared to 13.9% in another member state); in Ireland, 12.0% were born in another country; in Sweden, 9.4% were born in another country, largely outside the EU (7.8% outside the EU compared to 1.6% in another member state). In Finland, 4.5% of people aged 14 and younger were born abroad and 10.6% had a foreign-background in 2021. However, Gen Z from eastern Europe is much more homogenous: in Croatia, only 0.7% of those aged 14 and younger were foreign-born; in the Czech Republic, 1.1% aged 14 and younger were foreign-born.

Higher portions of those ages 15 to 29 in 2019 (which includes younger Millennials) were foreign born in Europe. Luxembourg had the highest share of young people (41.9%) born in a foreign country. More than 20% of this age group were foreign-born in Cyprus, Malta, Austria and Sweden. The highest shares of non-EU born young adults were found in Sweden, Spain and Luxemburg. Like with those under age 14, countries in eastern Europe generally have much smaller populations of foreign-born young adults. Poland, Lithuania, Slovakia, Bulgaria and Latvia had the lowest shares of foreign-born young people, at 1.4 to 2.5% of the total age group.

North America 
Data from Statistics Canada published in 2017 showed that Generation Z comprised 17.6% of the Canadian population.A report by demographer William Frey of the Brookings Institution stated that in the United States, the Millennials are a bridge between the largely white pre-Millennials (Generation X and their predecessors) and the more diverse post-Millennials (Generation Z and their successors). Frey's analysis of U.S. Census data suggests that as of 2019, 50.9% of Generation Z is white, 13.8% is black, 25.0% Hispanic, and 5.3% Asian. 29% of Generation Z are children of immigrants or immigrants themselves, compared to 23% of Millennials when they were at the same age.
Members of Generation Z are slightly less likely to be foreign-born than Millennials; the fact that more American Latinos were born in the U.S. rather than abroad plays a role in making the first wave of Generation Z appear better educated than their predecessors. However, researchers warn that this trend could be altered by changing immigration patterns and the younger members of Generation Z choosing alternate educational paths. As a demographic cohort, Generation Z is smaller than the Baby Boomers and their children, the Millennials. According to the U.S. Census Bureau, Generation Z makes up about one quarter of the U.S. population, as of 2015. There was an 'echo boom' in the 2000s, which certainly increased the absolute number of future young adults, but did not significantly change the relative sizes of this cohort compared to their parents.

According to a 2022 Gallup survey, 20.8%, or about one in five, members of Gen Z identify as LGBTQ+.

Economic trends 
As consumers, members of Generation Z are typically reliant to the Internet to research their options and to place orders. They tend to be skeptical and will shun firms whose actions and values are contradictory. Their purchases are heavily influenced by trends they see on social media.

In the West, while majorities might signal their support for certain ideals such as "environmental consciousness" to pollsters, actual purchases do not reflect their stated views, as can be seen from their high demand for cheap but not durable clothing ("fast fashion"), or preference for rapid delivery. Moreover, young Western consumers of this cohort are less likely to pay a premium for what they want compared to their counterparts from emerging economies.

Education 

Since the mid-20th century, enrollment rates in primary schools has increased significantly in developing countries. In 2019, the OECD completed a study showing that while education spending was up 15% over the previous decade, academic performance had stagnated. The Trends in International Mathematics and Science Study organization showed that the highest-scoring students in mathematics came from Singapore, Hong Kong, South Korea, Taiwan, and Japan. In science, the highest-scoring jurisdictions were South Korea, Japan, Singapore, Russia, and Hong Kong.

Different nations and territories approach the question of how to nurture gifted students differently. During the 2000s and 2010s, whereas the Middle East and East Asia (especially China, Hong Kong, and South Korea) and Singapore actively sought them out and steered them towards top programs, Europe and the United States had in mind the goal of inclusion and chose to focus on helping struggling students. In 2010, for example, China unveiled a decade-long National Talent Development Plan to identify able students and guide them into STEM fields and careers in high demand; that same year, England dismantled its National Academy for Gifted and Talented Youth and redirected the funds to help low-scoring students get admitted to elite universities. Developmental cognitive psychologist David Geary observed that Western educators remained "resistant" to the possibility that even the most talented of schoolchildren needed encouragement and support and tended to concentrate on low performers. In addition, even though it is commonly believed that past a certain IQ benchmark (typically 120), practice becomes much more important than cognitive abilities in mastering new knowledge, recently published research papers based on longitudinal studies, such as the Study of Mathematically Precocious Youth (SMPY) and the Duke University Talent Identification Program, suggest otherwise.

Since the early 2000s, the number of students from emerging economies going abroad for higher education has risen markedly. This was a golden age of growth for many Western universities admitting international students. In the late 2010s, around five million students traveled abroad each year for higher education, with the developed world being the most popular destinations and China the biggest source of international students. In 2019, the United States was the most popular destination for international students, with 30% of its international student body coming from mainland China, Australia, Canada, the United Kingdom, and Japan. However, geopolitical tensions and COVID-19 have ended the golden age for these universities.

Health issues

Mental 
Data from the British National Health Service (NHS) showed that between 1999 and 2017, the number of children below the age of 16 experiencing at least one mental disorder increased from 11.4% to 13.6%. The researcher interviewed older adolescents (aged 17–19) for the first time in 2017 and found that girls were two-thirds more likely than younger girls and twice more likely than boys from the same age group to have a mental disorder. In England, hospitalizations for self-harm doubled among teenage girls between 1997 and 2018, but there was no parallel development among boys. While the number of children receiving medical attention for mental health problems has clearly gone up, this is not necessarily an epidemic as the number of self-reports went up even faster possibly due to the diminution of stigma. Furthermore, doctors are more likely than before to diagnose a case of self-harm when previously they only treated the physical injuries.

A 2020 meta-analysis found that the most common psychiatric disorders among adolescents were ADHD, anxiety disorders, behavioral disorders, and depression, consistent with a previous one from 2015.

A 2021 UNICEF report stated that 13% of ten- to nineteen-year-olds around the world had a diagnosed mental health disorder whilst suicide was the fourth most common cause of death among fifteen- to nineteen-year-olds. It commented that "disruption to routines, education, recreation, as well as concern for family income, health and increase in stress and anxiety, [caused by the COVID-19 pandemic] is leaving many children and young people feeling afraid, angry and concerned for their future." It also noted that the pandemic had widely disrupted mental health services.

Sleep deprivation 
Sleep deprivation is on the rise among contemporary youths, due to a combination of poor sleep hygiene (having one's sleep disrupted by noise, light, and electronic devices), caffeine intake, beds that are too warm, a mismatch between biologically preferred sleep schedules at around puberty and social demands, insomnia, growing homework load, and having too many extracurricular activities. Consequences of sleep deprivation include low mood, worse emotional regulation, anxiety, depression, increased likelihood of self-harm, suicidal ideation, and impaired cognitive functioning. In addition, teenagers and young adults who prefer to stay up late tend to have high levels of anxiety, impulsivity, alcohol intake, and tobacco smoking.

A study by Glasgow University found that the number of schoolchildren in Scotland reporting sleep difficulties increased from 23% in 2014 to 30% in 2018. 37% of teenagers were deemed to have low mood (33% males and 41% females), and 14% were at risk of depression (11% males and 17% females). Older girls faced high pressure from schoolwork, friendships, family, career preparation, maintaining a good body image and good health.

In Canada, teenagers sleep on average between 6.5 and 7.5 hours each night, much less than what the Canadian Paediatric Society recommends, 10 hours. According to the Canadian Mental Health Association, only one out of five children who needed mental health services received it. In Ontario, for instance, the number of teenagers getting medical treatment for self-harm doubled in 2019 compared to ten years prior. The number of suicides has also gone up. Various factors that increased youth anxiety and depression include over-parenting, perfectionism (especially with regards to schoolwork), social isolation, social-media use, financial problems, housing worries, and concern over some global issues such as climate change.

Cognitive abilities 
A 2010 meta-analysis by an international team of mental health experts found that the worldwide prevalence of intellectual disability (ID) was around one percent. But the share of individuals with such a condition in low- to middle-income countries were up to twice as high as their wealthier counterparts because they lacked the sources needed to tackle the problem, such as preventing children from being born with ID due to hereditary conditions with antenatal genetic screening, poor child and maternal care facilities, and inadequate nutrition, leading to, for instance, iodine deficiency. The researchers also found that ID was more common among children and adolescents than adults. A 2020 literature review and meta-analysis confirmed that the incidence of ID was indeed more common than estimates from the early 2000s.

In 2013, a team of neuroscientists from the University College London published a paper on how neurodevelopmental disorders can affect a child's educational outcome. They found that up to 10% of the human population have specific learning disabilities or about two to three children in a (Western) classroom. Such conditions include dyscalculia, dyslexia, attention deficit hyperactivity disorder (ADHD), and autism spectrum disorder. They are caused by abnormal brain development due to complicated environmental and genetic factors. A child may have multiple learning disorders at the same time. For example, among children with ADHD, 33-45% also have dyslexia and 11% have dyscalculia. Normal or high levels of intelligence offer no protection. Each child has a unique cognitive and genetic profile and would benefit from a flexible education system.

A 2017 study from the Dominican Republic suggests that students from all sectors of the educational system utilize the Internet for academic purposes, yet those from lower socioeconomic backgrounds tend to rank the lowest in terms of reading comprehension skills.

A 2020 report by psychologist John Protzko analyzed over 30 studies and found that children have become better at delaying gratification over the previous 50 years, corresponding to an average increase of 0.18 standard deviations per decade on the IQ scale. This is contrary to the opinion of the majority of the 260 cognitive experts polled (84%), who thought this ability was deteriorating. Researchers test this ability using the Marshmallow Test. Children are offered treats: if they are willing to wait, they get two; if not, they only get one. The ability to delay gratification is associated with positive life outcomes, such as better academic performance, lower rates of substance use, and healthier body weights. Possible reasons for improvements in the delaying gratification include higher standards of living, better-educated parents, improved nutrition, higher preschool attendance rates, more test awareness, and environmental or genetic changes. This development does not mean that children from the early 20th century were worse at delaying gratification and those from the late 21st will be better at it, however. Moreover, some other cognitive abilities, such as simple reaction time, color acuity, working memory, the complexity of vocabulary usage, and three-dimensional visuospatial reasoning have shown signs of secular decline.

In a 2018 paper, cognitive scientists James R. Flynn and Michael Shayer argued that the observed gains in IQ during the 20th century—commonly known as the Flynn effect—had either stagnated or reversed, as can be seen from a combination of IQ and Piagetian tests. In the Nordic nations, there was a clear decline in general intelligence starting in the 1990s, an average of 6.85 IQ points if projected over 30 years. In Australia and France, the data remained ambiguous; more research was needed. In the United Kingdom, young children experienced a decline in the ability to perceive weight and heaviness, with heavy losses among top scorers. In German-speaking countries, young people saw a fall in spatial reasoning ability but an increase in verbal reasoning skills. In the Netherlands, preschoolers and perhaps schoolchildren stagnated (but seniors gained) in cognitive skills. What this means is that people were gradually moving away from abstraction to concrete thought. On the other hand, the United States continued its historic march towards higher IQ, a rate of 0.38 per decade, at least up until 2014. South Korea saw its IQ scores growing at twice the average U.S. rate. The secular decline of cognitive abilities observed in many developed countries might be caused by diminishing marginal returns due to industrialization and to intellectually stimulating environments for preschoolers, the cultural shifts that led to frequent use of electronic devices, the fall in cognitively demanding tasks in the job market in contrast to the 20th century, and possibly dysgenic fertility.

Physical 
A 2015 study found that the frequency of nearsightedness has doubled in the United Kingdom within the last 50 years. Ophthalmologist Steve Schallhorn, chairman of the Optical Express International Medical Advisory Board, noted that research has pointed to a link between the regular use of handheld electronic devices and eyestrain. The American Optometric Association sounded the alarm in a similar vein. According to a spokeswoman, digital eyestrain, or computer vision syndrome, is "rampant, especially as we move toward smaller devices and the prominence of devices increase in our everyday lives." Symptoms include dry and irritated eyes, fatigue, eye strain, blurry vision, difficulty focusing, headaches. However, the syndrome does not cause vision loss or any other permanent damage. To alleviate or prevent eyestrain, the Vision Council recommends that people limit screen time, take frequent breaks, adjust the screen brightness, change the background from bright colors to gray, increase text sizes, and blinking more often. Parents should not only limit their children's screen time but should also lead by example.

While food allergies have been observed by doctors since ancient times and virtually all foods can be allergens, research by the Mayo Clinic in Minnesota found they are becoming increasingly common since the early 2000s. Today, one in twelve American children has a food allergy, with peanut allergy being the most prevalent type. Reasons for this remain poorly understood. Nut allergies in general have quadrupled and shellfish allergies have increased 40% between 2004 and 2019. In all, about 36% of American children have some kind of allergy. By comparison, this number among the Amish in Indiana is 7%. Allergies have also risen ominously in other Western countries. In the United Kingdom, for example, the number of children hospitalized for allergic reactions increased by a factor of five between 1990 and the late 2010s, as did the number of British children allergic to peanuts. In general, the better developed the country, the higher the rates of allergies. Reasons for this remain poorly understood. One possible explanation, supported by the U.S. National Institute of Allergy and Infectious Diseases, is that parents keep their children "too clean for their own good". They recommend exposing newborn babies to a variety of potentially allergenic foods, such as peanut butter before they reach the age of six months. According to this "hygiene hypothesis", such exposures give the infant's immune system some exercise, making it less likely to overreact. Evidence for this includes the fact that children living on a farm are consistently less likely to be allergic than their counterparts who are raised in the city, and that children born in a developed country to parents who immigrated from developing nations are more likely to be allergic than their parents are.

A research article published in 2019 in the journal The Lancet reported that the number of South Africans aged 15 to 19 being treated for HIV increased by a factor of ten between 2010 and 2019. This is partly due to improved detection and treatment programs. However, less than 50% of the people diagnosed with HIV went onto receive antiviral medication due to social stigma, concerns about clinical confidentiality, and domestic responsibilities. While the annual number of deaths worldwide due to HIV/AIDS has declined from its peak in the early 2000s, experts warned that this venereal disease could rebound if the world's booming adolescent population is left unprotected.

Data from the Australian Bureau of Statistics reveal that 46% of Australians aged 18 to 24, about a million people, were overweight in 2017 and 2018. That number was 39% in 2014 and 2015. Obese individuals face higher risks of type II diabetes, heart disease, osteoarthritis, and stroke. The Australian Medical Associated and Obesity Coalition have urged the federal government to levy a tax on sugary drinks, to require health ratings, and to regulate the advertisement of fast foods. In all, the number of Australian adults who are overweight or obese rose from 63% in 2014–15 to 67% in 2017–18.

Puberty 
In Europe and the United States, the average age of the onset of puberty among girls was around 13 in the early 21st century, down from about 16 a hundred years earlier. Early puberty is associated with a variety of mental health issues, such as anxiety and depression (as people at this age tend to strongly desire conformity with their peers), early sexual activity, substance use, tobacco smoking, eating disorders, and disruptive behavioral disorders. Girls who mature early also face higher risks of sexual harassment. Moreover, in some cultures, pubertal onset remains a marker of readiness for marriage, for, in their point of view, a girl who shows signs of puberty might engage in sexual intercourse or risks being assaulted, and marrying her off is how she might be 'protected'. To compound matters, factors known for prompting mental health problems are themselves linked to early pubertal onset; these are early childhood stress, absent fathers, domestic conflict, and low socioeconomic status. Possible causes of early puberty could be positive, namely improved nutrition, or negative, such as obesity and stress. Other triggers include genetic factors, high body-mass index (BMI), exposure to endocrine-disrupting substances that remain in use, such as Bisphenol A (found in some plastics) and dichlorobenzene (used in mothballs and air deodorants), and to banned but persistent chemicals, such as dichlorodiphenyl-trichloroethane (DDT) and dichlorodiphenyldichloroethylene (DDE), and perhaps a combination thereof (the 'cocktail effect').

A 2019 meta-analysis and review of the research literature from all inhabited continents found that between 1977 and 2013, the age of pubertal onset among girls has fallen by an average of almost three months per decade, but with significant regional variations, ranging from 10.1 to 13.2 years in Africa to 8.8 to 10.3 years in the United States. This investigation relies on measurements of thelarche (initiation of breast tissue development) using the Tanner scale rather than self-reported menarche (first menstruation) and MRI brain scans for signs of the hypothalamic-pituitary-gonadal axis being reactivated. Furthermore, there is evidence that sexual maturity and psychosocial maturity no longer coincide; 21st-century youth appears to be reaching the former before the latter. Neither adolescents nor societies are prepared for this mismatch.

Political views and participation 

In the West, Generation Z's politics are largely similar to those of millennials. In tandem with more members of Generation Z being able to vote in elections during the late 2010s and early 2020s, the youth vote has increased. In the United States, Generation Z appears thus far to hold similar sociopolitical views to the millennials in that they tend to be more left-wing than preceding generations.

Polling on immigration receives mixed responses from Generation Z. Among developed democracies, young people's faith in the institutions, including their own government, has declined compared to that of previous generations.

An early political movement primarily driven by Generation Z was School Strike for Climate in the late 2010s. The movement involved millions of young people around the world, inspired by the activities of Swedish activist Greta Thunberg, protesting for greater action on climate change.

Members of Generation Z who are active in politics are more likely than their elders to avoid buying from or working for companies that do not share their sociopolitical views, and they take full advantage of the Internet as activists.

Religious tendencies 

Generation Z is the least religious generation in history. More members of Generation Z describe themselves as nonbelievers than any previous generation and reject religious affiliation, though many of them still describe themselves as spiritual. In the United States, Generation Z has twice as many self-identified atheists as prior generations.

The 2016 British Social Attitudes Survey found that 71% of people between the ages of 18 and 24 had no religion, compared to 62% the year before. A 2018 ComRes survey found that slightly more than one in two of those aged 18 to 24 reported a positive experience with Christians and Christianity. Two-thirds of the same age group have never attended church; among the remaining third, 20% went a few times a year, and 2% multiple times per week. 12% of respondents aged 18 to 24 agreed with the claim that Christians were a bad influence on society, compared to just over half who disagreed. For comparison, 14% of those aged 25 to 34 agreed. In all, 51% of Britons disagreed with the same while 10% agreed.

Globally, religion is in decline in the Euro-American countries but is growing in the rest of the world. According to the World Religious Database, the proportion of the human population identifying with a religion increased from 81% in 1970 to 85% in 2000 and is predicted to rise to 87% in 2025. The Catholic Church has gained 12% additional followers between 2000 and 2010, mainly from Asia and Africa. Islam is the world's fastest-growing religion, primarily due to the average younger age and higher fertility rate of Muslims.  Demographer Erick Kaufmann predicts that the expansion of secularism will slow in Europe as the 21st century progresses.

Risky behaviors

Adolescent pregnancy 
Gen Z American adolescents had lower levels of alcohol use and sexual intercourse than other generations in early adulthood. More broadly, adolescent pregnancy was in decline during the early 21st century all across the industrialized world, due to the widespread availability of contraception and the growing avoidance of sexual intercourse among teenagers. In New Zealand, the pregnancy rate for females aged 15 to 19 dropped from 33 per 1,000 in 2008 to 16 in 2016. Highly urbanized regions had adolescent pregnancy rates well below the national average whereas Maori communities had much higher than average rates. In Australia, it was 15 per 1,000 in 2015.

Alcoholism and substance use 
2020 data from the U.K. Office for National Statistics (ONS) showed on a per-capita basis, members of Generation Z binged on alcohol 20% less often than Millennials. However, 9.9% of people aged 16 to 24 consumed at least one drug in the past month, usually cannabis, or more than twice the share of the population between the ages of 16 and 59. "Cannabis has now taken over from the opiates in terms of the most people in treatment for addiction," psychopharmacologist Val Curran of the University College London (UCL) told The Telegraph. Moreover, the quality and affordability of various addictive drugs have improved in recent years, making them an appealing alternative to alcoholic beverages for many young people, who now have the ability to arrange a meeting with a deal via social media. Addiction psychiatrist Adam Winstock of UCL found using his Global Drug Survey that young people rated cocaine more highly than alcohol on the basis of value for money, 4.8 compared to 4.7 out of 10.

As of 2019, cannabis was legal for both medical and recreational use in Uruguay, Canada, and 33 states in the US. In the United States, Generation Z is the first to be born into a time when the legalization of marijuana at the federal level is being seriously considered. While adolescents (people aged 12 to 17) in the late 2010s were more likely to avoid both alcohol and marijuana compared to their predecessors from 20 years before, college-aged youths are more likely than their elders to consume marijuana. Marijuana use in Western democracies was three times the global average, as of 2012, and in the U.S., the typical age of first use is 16. This is despite the fact that marijuana use is linked to some risks for young people, such as in the impairment of cognitive abilities and school performance, though a causality has not been established in this case.

Youth crime 
During the 2010s, when most of Generation Z experienced some or all of their adolescence, reductions in youth crime were seen in some Western countries. A report looking at statistics from 2018 to 2019 noted that the numbers of young people aged ten to seventeen in England and Wales being cautioned or sentenced for criminal activity had fallen by 83% over the previous decade, while those entering the youth justice system for the first time had fallen by 85%. In 2006, 3,000 youths in England and Wales were detained for criminal activity; ten years later, that number fell below 1,000. In Europe, teenagers were less likely to fight than before. Research from Australia suggested that crime rates among adolescents had consistently declined between 2010 and 2019. In a 2014 report, Statistics Canada stated that police-reported crimes committed by persons between the ages of 12 and 17 had been falling steadily since 2006 as part of a larger trend of decline from a peak in 1991. Between 2000 and 2014, youth crimes plummeted 42%, above the drop for overall crime of 34%. In fact, between the late 2000s and mid-2010s, the fall was especially rapid. This was primarily driven by a 51% drop in theft of items worth no more than CAN$5,000 and burglary. The most common types of crime committed by Canadian adolescents were theft and violence. At school, the most frequent offenses were possession of cannabis, common assault, and uttering threats. Overall, although they made up only 7% of the population, adolescents stood accused of 13% of all crimes in Canada. In addition, mid- to late-teens were more likely to be accused of crimes than any other age group in the country.

Family and social life

Upbringing 

Sociologists Judith Treas and Giulia M. Dotti Sani analyzed the diaries of 122,271 parents (68,532 mothers and 53,739 fathers) aged 18 to 65 in households with at least one child below the age of 13 from 1965 to 2012 in ten Western countries—Canada, the United Kingdom, Spain, Italy, France, the Netherlands, Germany, Denmark, Norway, and Slovenia—and discovered that in general, parents had been spending more and more time with their children. In 1965, a mother spent on average 54 minutes, nearly an hour, on childcare activities each day whereas one from 2012 spent almost twice as much, at 104 minutes, almost two hours. Among fathers, the amount of time spent on childcare roughly quadrupled, from 16 minutes in 1965 to 59 in 2012. Parents of all education levels were represented, though those with higher education typically spent much more time with their children, especially university-educated mothers. France was the only exception. French mothers were spending less time with their children whereas fathers were spending more time. This overall trend reflected the dominant ideology of "intensive parenting" – the idea that the time parents spend with children is crucial for their development in various areas and the fact that fathers developed more egalitarian views with regards to gender roles over time and became more likely to want to play an active role in their children's lives.

In the United Kingdom, there was a widespread belief in the early 21st century that rising parental, societal and state concern for the safety of children was leaving them increasingly mollycoddled and slowing the pace they took on responsibilities. The same period saw a rise in child-rearing's position in the public discourse with parenting manuals and reality TV programs focused on family life, such as Supernanny, providing specific guidelines for how children should be cared for and disciplined.

According to Statistics Canada, the number of households with both grandparents and grandchildren remained rare but grew in the early 21st century. In 2011, five percent of Canadian children below the age of ten lived with a grandparent, up from 3.3% in the previous decade. This is in part because Canadian parents in the early 21st century couldn't (or believe they couldn't) afford childcare and often find themselves having to work long hours or irregular shifts. Meanwhile, many grandparents struggled to keep up with their highly active grandchildren on a regular basis due to their age. Because Millennials and members of Generation X tend to have fewer children than their parents the Baby Boomers, each child typically receives more attention from his or her grandparents and parents compared to previous generations.

Friendships and socialization 
According to the OECD PISA surveys, 15-year-olds in 2015 had a tougher time making friends at school than ten years prior. European teenagers were becoming more and more like their Japanese and South Korean counterparts in social isolation. This might be due to intrusive parenting, heavy use of electronic devices, and concerns over academic performance and job prospects.

A study of social interaction among American teenagers found that the amount of time young people spent with their friends had been trending downwards since the 1970s but fallen into especially sharp decline after 2010. The percentage of students in the 12th grade (typically 17 to 18 years old) who said they met with their friends almost every day fell from 52% in 1976 to 28% in 2017. The percentage of that age group who said they often felt lonely (which had fallen during the early 2000s) increased from 26% in 2012 to 39% in 2017 whilst the percentage who often felt left out increased from 30% to 38% over the same period. Statistics for slightly younger teenagers suggested that parties had become significantly less common since the 1980s.

Romance and marriage 
According to a 2014 report from UNICEF, some 250 million females were forced into marriage before the age of 15, especially in South Asia and sub-Saharan Africa. Problems faced by child brides include loss of educational opportunity, less access to medical care, higher childbirth mortality rates, depression, and suicidal ideation.

In Australia, it was reported in 2017 that growing numbers of older teenage boys and young men were avoiding romantic relationships altogether, citing concerns over the traumatic experiences of older male family members, including false accusations of sexual misconduct or loss of assets and money after a divorce. This social trend—Men Going Their Own Way (MGTOW)—is an outgrowth of the men's rights movement, but one that emphasizes detachment from women as a way to deal with the issues men face. "Both sexes have different challenges; we've lost sight of that. We're stuck in a gender war and it's harming our children," psychologist Meredith Fuller told News.com.au.

In China, young people nowadays are much more likely to deem marriage and children sources of stress rather than fulfillment, going against the Central Government's attempts to increase the birth rate. Women born between the mid-1990s to about 2010 are less interested in getting married than men their own age. As a result of the one-child policy, young Chinese women have become more educated and financially independent than ever before, and this has led to a shift in public attitudes towards career-oriented women. The "lying flat" movement, popular among Chinese youths, also extends to the domain of marriage and child-rearing. According to a 2021 survey by the Communist Youth League, 44% of young urban women and 25% of urban young men said they were not planning on getting married. When asked why, majorities said they had trouble finding the right person, cited the high costs of marriage, or told the pollsters they simply did not believe in marriage.

Children and parenthood 
In line with a fall in adolescent pregnancy in the developed world, which is discussed in more detail elsewhere in this article, there has also been a reduction in the percentage of the youngest adults with children. The Office for National Statistics has reported that the number of babies being born in the United Kingdom to 18 year old mothers had fallen by 58% from 2000 to 2016 and the amount being born to 18 year old fathers had fallen by 41% over the same period. Pew Research reports that in 2016, 88% of American women aged 18 to 21 were childless as opposed to 80% of Generation X and 79% of millennial female youth at a similar age.

A 2020 survey conducted by PensionBee in the United Kingdom found that about 10% of non-parents aged 18 to 23 were considering not having children in order to be able to retire earlier. Those in the arts and those in the income bracket £25,001 to £55,000 were most likely to say no to having children.

Over half of Chinese youths aged 18 to 26 said they were uninterested in having children because of the high cost of child-rearing, according to a 2021 poll by the Communist Youth League.

Food choices 
The food choices made by Generation Z reflect the generation's concerns about climate, sustainability, and animal welfare. A study by foodservice firm Aramark found 79% of members of the generation would like to eat more meatless meals. The generation is considered the most interested in plant-based and vegan food choices, which they see as equal to other food types. As Generation Z's purchasing power grows, so does the amount of vegan and vegetarian food they eat. Generation Z sees dining out with friends and sharing small plates of food as exciting and interesting. According to 2022 Ernst & Young data, plant-based meat, cultured meat, and fermented meat are forecast to grow to 40% of the market by volume by 2040 in the United States. Plant-based meat is widely available in supermarkets and restaurants, but cultured and fermented meats (which are made without slaughtering animals) are not commercially available but are now being developed by companies.

Use of information and communications technologies (ICT)

Use of ICT in general 

Generation Z is one of the first cohorts to have Internet technology readily available at a young age. With the Web 2.0 revolution that occurred throughout the mid-late 2000s and 2010s, they have been exposed to an unprecedented amount of technology in their upbringing, with the use of mobile devices growing exponentially over time. Anthony Turner characterizes Generation Z as having a "digital bond to the Internet", and argues that it may help youth to escape from emotional and mental struggles they face offline.

According to U.S. consultants Sparks and Honey in 2014, 41% of Generation Z spend more than three hours per day using computers for purposes other than schoolwork, compared with 22% in 2004. In 2015, an estimated 150,000 apps, 10% of apps in Apple's App Store, were educational and aimed at children up to college level, though opinions are mixed as to whether the net result will be deeper involvement in learning and more individualized instruction, or impairment through greater technology dependence and a lack of self-regulation that may hinder child development. Parents of Gen Zers fear the overuse of the Internet, and dislike the ease of access to inappropriate information and images, as well as social networking sites where children can gain access to people worldwide. Children reversely feel annoyed with their parents and complain about parents being overly controlling when it comes to their Internet usage.

A 2015 study by Microsoft found that 77% of respondents aged 18 to 24 said yes to the statement, "When nothing is occupying my attention, the first thing I do is reach for my phone," compared to just 10% for those aged 65 and over.

In a TEDxHouston talk, Jason Dorsey of the Center for Generational Kinetics stressed the notable differences in the way that Millennials and Generation Z consume technology, with 18% of Generation Z feeling that it is okay for a 13-year-old to have a smartphone, compared with just 4% for the previous generation. An online newspaper about texting, SMS and MMS writes that teens own cellphones without necessarily needing them; that receiving a phone is considered a rite of passage in some countries, allowing the owner to be further connected with their peers, and it is now a social norm to have one at an early age. An article from the Pew Research Center stated that "nearly three-quarters of teens have or have access to a smartphone and 30% have a basic phone, while just 12% of teens 13 to 15 say they have no cell phone of any type". These numbers are only on the rise and the fact that the majority own a cell phone has become one of this generation's defining characteristics. Consequently, "24% of teens go online 'almost constantly'."

A survey of students from 79 countries by the OECD found that the amount of time spent using an electronic device has increased, from under two hours per weekday in 2012 to close to three in 2019, at the expense of extracurricular reading.

Psychologists have observed that sexting—or the transmission of sexually explicit content via electronic devices—has seen noticeable growth among contemporary adolescents. Older teenagers are more likely to participate in sexting. Besides some cultural and social factors such as the desire for acceptance and popularity among peers, the falling age at which a child receives a smartphone may contribute to the growth in this activity. However, while it is clear that sexting has an emotional impact on adolescents, it is still not clear how it precisely affects them. Some consider it a high-risk behavior because of the ease of dissemination to third parties leading to reputational damage and the link to various psychological conditions including depression and even suicidal ideation. Others defend youths' freedom of expression over the Internet. In any case, there is some evidence that at least in the short run, sexting brings positive feelings of liveliness or satisfaction. However, girls are more likely than boys to be receiving insults, social rejections, or reputational damage as a result of sexting.

Digital literacy 

Despite being labeled as 'digital natives', the 2018 International Computer and Information Literacy Study (ICILS), conducted on 42,000 eighth-graders (or equivalents) from 14 countries and education systems, found that only two percent of these people were sufficiently proficient with information devices to justify that description, and only 19% could work independently with computers to gather information and to manage their work. ICILS assesses students on two main categories: Computer and Information Literacy (CIL), and Computational Thinking (CT). For CIL, there are four levels, one to four, with Level 4 being the highest. Although at least 80% of students from most countries tested reached Level 1, only two percent on average reached Level 4. Countries or education systems whose students scored near or above the international average of 496 in CIL were, in increasing order, France, North Rhine-Westphalia, Portugal, Germany, the United States, Finland, South Korea, Moscow, and Denmark. CT is divided into four levels, the Upper, Middle, and Lower Regions. International averages for the proportions of students reaching each of these were 18%, 50%, and 32%, respectively. Countries or education systems whose students scored near or above the international average of 500 were, in increasing order, the United States, France, Finland, Denmark, and South Korea. In general, female eighth-graders outperformed their male counterparts in CIL by an international average of 18 points but were narrowly outclassed by their male counterparts in CT. (Narrow gaps made estimates of averages have higher coefficients of variation.) In the United States, where the computer-based tests were administered by the National Center for Education Statistics, 72% of eighth-graders said they searched for information on the Internet at least once a week or every school day, and 65% reported they were autodidactic information finders on the Internet.

Pornography viewing 
A 2020 report by the British Board of Film Classification (BBFC)—available only by request due to the presence of graphic materials—suggests that parents are either in denial or are completely oblivious to the prevalence of pornography viewership by adolescents, with three quarters telling researchers they do not believe their children consumed such materials. Meanwhile, teenagers are increasingly turning to pornography as a source of information on sexuality, especially what to do during a sexual encounter, as teachers tend to focus on contraception. Over half of the teenagers interviewed told researchers they had viewed pornography, though the actual number is likely higher due to the sensitivity of this topic. While parents generally believe adolescents who view pornography for pleasure tend to be boys, surveys and interviews reveal that this behavior is also common among girls. Most teenagers encounter pornography on a dedicated website, but an increasing number watch it on social media platforms such as Snapchat and WhatsApp. Many told researchers they felt anxious about their body image and the expectations of their potential sexual partners as a result of viewing, and their concerns over violent behavior. About one-third of the U.K. population watches these films, according to industry estimates. This report came as part of an ill-fated attempt by the U.K. government to introduce age verification to pornographic websites.

Use of social media networks 

The use of social media has become integrated into the daily lives of most Gen Zers with access to mobile technology, who use it primarily to keep in contact with friends and family. As a result, mobile technology has caused online relationship development to become a new generational norm. Gen Z uses social media and other sites to strengthen bonds with friends and to develop new ones. They interact with people who they otherwise would not have met in the real world, becoming a tool for identity creation. The negative side to mobile devices for Generation Z, according to Twenge, is they are less "face to face", and thus feel more lonely and left out. Speed and reliability are important factors in members of Generation Z's choice of social networking platform. This need for quick communication is presented in popular Generation Z apps like Vine and the prevalent use of emojis.

Focus group testing found that while teens may be annoyed by many aspects of Facebook, they continue to use it because participation is important in terms of socializing with friends and peers. Twitter and Instagram are seen to be gaining popularity among members of Generation Z, with 24% (and growing) of teens with access to the Internet having Twitter accounts. This is, in part, due to parents not typically using these social networking sites. Snapchat is also seen to have gained attraction in Generation Z because videos, pictures, and messages send much faster on it than in regular messaging. TikTok has gained increasing popularity among Gen Z users, surpassing Instagram in 2021. So as of 2022, TikTok has around 689 million active users, 43% of whom are from Gen Z. Based on current growth figures, it is predicted that by the end of 2023, TikTok audience will grow by 1.5 billion active users, 70% of whom will be from Generation Z. As of 2023, so popular is TikTok among people under the age of 30 in Europe and North America that they typically ignore their own governments' concerns over issues of user privacy and national security.

A study by Gabrielle Borca, et al found that teenagers in 2012 were more likely to share different types of information than teenagers in 2006. However, they will take steps to protect information that they do not want being shared, and are more likely to "follow" others on social media than "share". A survey of U.S. teenagers from advertising agency J. Walter Thomson likewise found that the majority of teenagers are concerned about how their posting will be perceived by people or their friends. 72% of respondents said they were using social media on a daily basis, and 82% said they thought carefully about what they post on social media. Moreover, 43% said they had regrets about previous posts.

A 2019 Childwise survey of 2,000 British children aged five to sixteen found that the popularity of Facebook halved compared to the previous year. Children of the older age group, fifteen to sixteen, reported signs of online fatigue, with about three of ten saying they wanted to spend less time on the Internet.

Effects of screen time 

In his 2017 book Irresistible, professor of marketing Adam Alter explained that not only are children addicted to electronic gadgets, but their addiction jeopardizes their ability to read non-verbal social cues.

A 2019 meta-analysis of thousands of studies from almost two dozen countries suggests that while as a whole, there is no association between screen time and academic performance, when the relation between individual screen-time activity and academic performance is examined, negative associations are found. Watching television is negatively correlated with overall school grades, language fluency, and mathematical ability while playing video games was negatively associated with overall school grades only. According to previous research, screen activities not only take away the time that could be spent on homework, physical activities, verbal communication, and sleep (the time-displacement hypothesis) but also diminish mental activities (the passivity hypothesis). Furthermore, excessive television viewing is known for harming the ability to pay attention as well as other cognitive functions; it also causes behavioral disorders, such as having unhealthy diets, which could damage academic performance. Excessive video gaming, on the other hand, is known for impairing social skills and mental health, and as such could also damage academic performance. However, depending on the nature of the game, playing it could be beneficial for the child; for instance, the child could be motivated to learn the language of the game in order to play it better. Among adolescents, excessive Internet surfing is well known for being negatively associated with school grades, though previous research does not distinguish between the various devices used. Nevertheless, one study indicates that Internet access, if used for schoolwork, is positively associated with school grades but if used for leisure, is negatively associated with it. Overall, the effects of screen time are stronger among adolescents than children.

Research conducted in 2017 reports that the social media usage patterns of this generation may be associated with loneliness, anxiety, and fragility and that girls may be more affected than boys by social media. According to 2018 CDC reports, girls are disproportionately affected by the negative aspects of social media than boys. Researchers at the University of Essex analyzed data from 10,000 families, from 2010 to 2015, assessing their mental health utilizing two perspectives: Happiness and Well-being throughout social, familial, and educational perspectives. Within each family, they examined children who had grown from 10 to 15 during these years. At age 10, 10% of female subjects reported social media use, while this was only true for 7% of the male subjects. By age 15, this variation jumped to 53% for girls, and 41% for boys. This percentage influx may explain why more girls reported experiencing cyberbullying, decreased self-esteem, and emotional instability more than their male counterparts.

Other researchers hypothesize that girls are more affected by social media usage because of how they use it. In a study conducted by the Pew Research Center in 2015, researchers discovered that while 78% of girls reported making a friend through social media, only 52% of boys could say the same. However, boys are not explicitly less affected by this statistic. They also found that 57% of boys claimed to make friends through video gaming, while this was only true for 13% of girls. Another Pew Research Center survey conducted in April 2015, reported that women are more likely to use Pinterest, Facebook, and Instagram than men. In counterpoint, men were more likely to utilize online forums, e-chat groups, and Reddit than women.

Cyberbullying is more common now than among Millennials, the previous generation. It is more common among girls, 22% compared to 10% for boys. This results in young girls feeling more vulnerable to being excluded and undermined.

According to a 2020 report by the British Board of Film Classification, "many young people felt that the way they viewed their overall body image was more likely the result of the kinds of body images they saw on Instagram."

See also

 9X Generation (Vietnam)
 Boomerang Generation
 Cusper
 Generation K, a demographic cohort defined by Noreena Hertz
 Generation Z in the United States
 Post-90s and Little emperor syndrome (China)
 Strawberry generation (Taiwan)
 Thumb tribe
 Puriteen

Notes

References

Further reading

External links 

 The Downside of Diversity. Michael Jonas. The New York Times. August 5, 2007.
 The Next America: Modern Family. Pew Research Center. April 30, 2014. (Video, 2:16)
 Meet Generation Z: Forget Everything You Learned About Millennials – 2014 presentation by Sparks and Honey
 Is a University Degree a Waste of Money? CBC News: The National. March 1, 2017. (Video, 14:39)
 A Generation Z Exploration. (Web version) Rubin Postaer and Associates (RPA). 2018.
We asked teenagers what adults are missing about technology. This was the best response. Taylor Fang. MIT Technology Review. December 21, 2019.
 The Amish use tech differently than you think. We should emulate them. Jeff Smith. The Washington Post. February 17, 2020.

Generation Z
20th century
21st century
1990s neologisms